Florence Ita Giwa  (born 19 February 1946) is a Nigerian politician, who was the Senator for the Cross River South Senatorial District of Cross River State.

She attended the Kilburn Polytechnic in London, United Kingdom. She became a nurse, then a representative for the Beecham pharmaceutical company, and then moved to Standall Pharmaceutical where she represented Lagos State. She married Dele Giwa, the founding editor of Newswatch magazine. They were married for only ten months, after which Dele Giwa married Olufunmi Olaniyan, who was married to him until his death in 1986.

Ita-Giwa joined politics and emerged as NRC chairman for Delta State. Thereafter, she was elected a member of the federal House of Representatives (1992–93), and was a member of the committee on devolution of power, constituent assembly 1994–95. She became involved in Bakassi affairs, and earned the nickname "Mama Bakassi".
Ita-Giwa was elected Senator for the Cross River South constituency in April 1999 and was appointed to committees on Rules and Procedures, Environment, Foreign Affairs, Women, Niger Delta and Drug & Narcotics.

After leaving the senate in 2003, she joined the People's Democratic Party PDP, and  became President Olusegun Obasanjo's Special Adviser on National Assembly Matters. In May 2010, there were rumors that funds were missing from the account of the Bakassi Resettlement Committee, chaired by Ita Giwa, who asked the Economic and Financial Crimes Commission to investigate the matter.

Ita Giwa has worked against human trafficking and sex slavery.

She has received the OON (Officer of the Order of the Niger) and The Sun Lifetime Achievement Award.

Personal life 
Despite her advance in age, Florence Ita Giwa still has great love for fashion. Her love for expensive jewelries as well as tastefully designed headwear can not be overly emphasized.

References

Living people
1946 births
People from Cross River State
All People's Party (Nigeria) politicians
Peoples Democratic Party members of the Senate (Nigeria)
Women members of the Senate (Nigeria)
20th-century Nigerian politicians
21st-century Nigerian politicians
21st-century Nigerian women politicians